Não São Paulo, Vol. 2 is a compilation album released by famous Brazilian independent label Baratos Afins in 1987, one year after the previous installment, Não São Paulo, Vol. 1. Unlike the previous compilation, that featured relatively well-known Brazilian post-punk bands active during the mid-1980s, Vol. 2 brings out more obscure bands (with the exception of Nau, fronted by Brazilian LGBT activist Vange Leonel, and 365, a slightly popular punk rock band from São Paulo).

The album was re-issued under CD form in 1996, featuring four additional bonus tracks.

It is worth noting that the lyrics to "Sofro", by Nau, were taken from a poem written by Portuguese poet Fernando Pessoa (under the pen name Ricardo Reis). "Grândola, Vila Morena" is a cover of Zeca Afonso's eponymous song.

Track listing

See also
 The Sexual Life of the Savages
 Não Wave
 Não São Paulo, Vol. 1
 No New York

References

External links
 Both the Não São Paulo albums at the official site of Baratos Afins 
 Não São Paulo, Vol. 2 at Discogs

1987 compilation albums
Post-punk compilation albums
Compilation albums by Brazilian artists